Old Billy (also called Billy or Ol' Billy) was the longest-living horse on record. Old Billy was verified to be 62 at his death. Born in Woolston, Cheshire, England in 1760, Billy adventured and became a barge horse that pulled barges up and down canals. Old Billy was said to look like a big cob/shire horse, and was brown with a white blaze. Billy died on 27 November 1822 at the estate of William Earle, a director of the Mersey and Irwell Navigation Company, in Everton, Liverpool.

Billy's skull now resides in the Manchester Museum. A lithograph was published, showing Old Billy with Squire Henry Harrison, who had "known the animal for fifty-nine years", and a portrait of him is held at the Warrington Museum & Art Gallery.

See also
List of longest-living organisms

References

External links
Death of Old Billy

Individual draft horses
1760 animal births
1822 animal deaths
Individual male horses
Oldest animals